Thomas F. Ashworth  (born October 10, 1977) is a former American football offensive tackle. Originally signed as an undrafted free agent by the San Francisco 49ers out of the University of Colorado at Boulder. Ashworth attended Cherry Creek High School in Greenwood Village, Colorado.

On December 18, 2005, Ashworth caught a touchdown pass against the Tampa Bay Buccaneers from Tom Brady when playing for the New England Patriots. On February 29, 2008 his contract was terminated by the Seahawks.

References

1977 births
Living people
San Francisco 49ers players
New England Patriots players
Players of American football from Denver
Seattle Seahawks players
American football offensive tackles
Colorado Buffaloes football players